Hasnie is a surname. Notable people with the surname include:

Aishah Hasnie (born 1984/1985), American television journalist 
Shujaat Ali Hasnie (1905–?), Pakistani banker